Emerald Lake is a small lake located nearby Lassen Peak in Lassen Volcanic National Park, in Shasta County, California.

Highway 89 runs along the eastern shore of the small lake.

See also
List of lakes in California

References

Lakes of Lassen Volcanic National Park
Lakes of Shasta County, California
Lakes of California
Lakes of Northern California